Theater of Illusion is the fourteenth album by musical duo Nox Arcana's. Its theme is that of an old theater haunted by a masked magician. The album is a popular source of music for professional illusionists.

Story

The world-famous and mysterious masked magician named Doctor Arcana captured global attention with his astounding illusions and spectacular, death-defying escapes. However, at the peak of his career, the magician vanished without a trace under mysterious circumstances. Several rumors began circulating, concerning his whereabouts and fate, but the truth remains a mystery to the present day.

A Gothic mansion at a secluded country estate once served as Doctor Arcana's home. Since the magician's disappearance, there have been reports of strange sounds and shadows from within the sprawling mansion, but no living soul has been able to gain entry to investigate the matter, and Arcana Manor has stood abandoned and undisturbed for more than two decades. Unknown to many, a hidden theater lies within the dark manor. This venue, hidden from the outside world, is where master magicians gather to display their talents every Halloween night.

Video game
In 2018, Joseph Vargo released a video game based on the album's theme and story, entitled The Cabinets of Doctor Arcana. The challenge is to resolve a maze of riddles and perplexing puzzles in order to avoid spending eternity locked inside the inescapable mansion.

Track listing
 "Abracadabra" — 1:40
 "Cobwebs" — 2:40
 "Nostalgia" — 2:24
 "Forgotten Dreams" — 4:17
 "Edge of Darkness" — 3:09
 "Phantom Theater" — 3:03
 "Hypnos" — 1:05
 "The Curtain Rises" — 0:56
 "The Crimson Hourglass" — 3:03
 "Sinister Cabaret" — 2:57
 "Necromancer" — 3:46
 "The Mask of Arcana" — 3:41
 "Shadow Play" — 3:54
 "Voodoo" — 3:52
 "Mysterium" — 4:01
 "Swords of Kali" — 3:57
 "Smoke and Mirrors" — 3:19
 "The Prestige" — 2:52
 "Black Fire" — 3:04
 "Dark Destiny" — 3:16
 "Lord of Illusions"  — 6:51
 The song "Lord of Illusions" ends at 3:45, but there are two untitled hidden tracks: the first hidden track starts at 4:15 and ends at 5:20; the second hidden track starts at 5:30 and ends at 6:51.

References

External links
 Nox Arcana's official website
[ Theater of Illusion] at Allmusic

Nox Arcana albums
2010 albums